Andrew James Barr (born 29 April 1973) is an Australian politician who has been serving as the 7th Chief Minister of the Australian Capital Territory since 2014. He has been an Australian Labor Party member in the ACT Legislative Assembly since 2006, after being elected on a countback to replace former Treasurer Ted Quinlan, who resigned mid-term. Barr was immediately promoted to Cabinet upon his election. On 11 December 2014 he was elected as Chief Minister after his predecessor, Katy Gallagher, resigned and announced her intention to run for the Senate. In addition to being Chief Minister, he holds the portfolios of Treasurer, Social Inclusion and Equality, Tourism and Special Events, and Trade, Industry and Investment.

Barr is the first openly LGBTI head of government in Australia (from 2014), and was the first openly LGBTI member as well as government cabinet minister in the ACT Legislative Assembly from 2006.

Early life 
Barr was born in Lismore, New South Wales, and was raised in Canberra, attending Holt Pre-School, the AME School, Turner Primary School, Lyneham High School and Lake Ginninderra College. He studied political science, economics and economic history at the Australian National University, graduating with a Bachelor of Arts (Policy Studies). Barr became involved in student politics, serving as Treasurer of the Australian National University Students' Association and as a director on the board of the Australian National University Union.

Career

Early career 
After graduating in 1995, Barr worked for the Federal parliamentarian Annette Ellis and later the then ACT Opposition Leader Jon Stanhope, before embarking on a career change to the private sector in 1999 as a media analyst and account manager.

During the 1990s Barr became a leading influence within the right faction of ACT Labor (Centre Coalition) and was involved in the successful election of the first non-left faction ACT party secretary, Michael Kerrisk.  In 2006, Barr said, "When I came out in the late '90s I had already been in the party for some eight years, so people were already used to me.... But it was at this time though that I decided to step back from front-line politics. It was a big change in my life and it was at this time that I met my partner Anthony, so I just needed time to adjust."

Return to politics 
Barr returned to political life in 2002 as a senior adviser to John Hargreaves, the Government Whip. Following Hargreaves' election to the ministry in November 2004, Barr was appointed his chief of staffa position he held until his election to the Assembly in April 2006.
In early 2004, Barr won pre-selection for the Labor ticket in the seven-member Molonglo electorate, which included Barr's suburb of Dickson and that of his previous residence in Braddon. He campaigned largely on financial management, housing affordability and urban infrastructure issues, such as balanced territory budgets, tax concessions for first home buyers, inner city parking permits and footpath and street lighting upgrades, while also expressing support for gay law reform, the reproductive rights of women, multiculturalism and refugees. Barr polled strongly in inner city booths and ultimately found himself in contention for the seventh and final Molonglo seat, along with Liberals Jacqui Burke, Zed Seselja and fellow Labor candidate Mike Hettinger, but narrowly missed out, coming in tenth.

Barr continued working for Hargreaves after the election, but received a second chance at entering the Assembly when the Treasurer, Ted Quinlan, resigned in March 2006. The resulting countback saw the redistribution of Quinlan's primary vote and Barr's election to the ACT Legislative Assembly.

Quinlan's resignation from the Assembly sparked a ministerial reshuffle, with Barr immediately entering the ministry upon taking his seat. He was assigned the Education, Training, Industrial Relations, Sport and Tourism portfolios. Barr dedicated most of his maiden speech to economic management, housing affordability and progressive social reform

Barr was re-elected to the seat of Molonglo for the 2008 and 2012 ACT elections. Following a major redistribution, he was elected to the seat of Kurrajong at the 2016 election and re-elected in 2020.

Treasurer and Chief Minister 
Following the resignation of Jon Stanhope in May 2011, Barr was appointed Deputy Chief Minister in the cabinet of new Chief Minister Katy Gallagher. Following Gallagher's resignation to run for the Senate, Barr was elected as Chief Minister on 11 December 2014. As leader, Barr led ACT Labor to a fifth consecutive general election win in October 2016.

Economic development and taxation reforms 

In 2012, following a review by former Treasurer Ted Quinlan, Barr announced a 20-year program to transform the ACT taxation system, with the intention of making the system fairer, simpler and more efficient. This program includes the abolition of stamp duty on property transfers and insurance premiums, with the foregone revenue replaced through the general rates system—an approach supported by most economists. New South Wales and Victoria have expressed support for similar reforms.

As Treasurer and Chief Minister, Barr has focused on the ACT's economic development, particularly encouraging private sector investment in higher education, trade, tourism, major events, arts and sport. Consequently, the ACT economy and employment has diversified away from its traditional public sector base.

In 2016, the ACT Government secured international flights for Canberra, with Singapore Airlines operating a 'Capital Express' route linking Singapore, Canberra and Wellington, and Qatar Airways operating flights via Sydney. In the same year, he established the Office of the Commissioner for International Engagement, with responsibility for building and cultivating international relationships for the economic, social and cultural benefit of the ACT.

Stage 1 of the Canberra light rail launched in April 2019, connecting Canberra's northern suburbs in Gungahlin with the city's centre via the Northbourne Avenue corridor. In October 2019, Barr launched the ACT Government's Infrastructure Plan outlining key health, transport, education and environmental infrastructure priorities including a new hospital and stadium, Canberra Institute of Technology (CIT) campus upgrades and stage 2 of light rail. Subject to Commonwealth approvals, construction of stage 2 to Woden will start in early 2021.

In 2020, Barr announced a major expansion of UNSW Canberra, with the establishment of a new campus in Canberra's centre on the existing CIT site.

Environment and Climate Change
Barr's government has continued its predecessors' environment and climate change policies, including reducing carbon emissions and increasing the use of renewable energy. Under its Climate Change Strategy, the ACT Government has a target of reducing emissions by 50–60% (from 1990 levels) by 2025 and net zero emissions by 2045.

In May 2019, the ACT joined other jurisdictions around the world in declaring a state of climate emergency, and called for urgent action to address climate change.

In September 2019, the ACT Government announced it would be the first major jurisdiction outside of the European Union to achieve net-zero greenhouse gas emissions electricity supply with the commencement of an energy offtake agreement with Hornsdale Wind Farm in South Australia.

LGBTI rights 

Barr has been a strong supporter of same-sex marriage and LGBTI rights, voting in favour of anti-discrimination law reform, civil unions, civil partnerships and same-sex marriage laws.

His government has continued to champion measures to remove discrimination and promote inclusion of LGBTI communities. In 2017, Barr was a prominent advocate for the 'Yes' campaign in the Australian Marriage Law Postal Survey, in which the ACT had the highest Yes result (74%) and participation rate (82.5%) in Australia. In 2018, his government announced its intention to ban gay conversion practices in the ACT, and removed the ability for religious schools to discriminate against LGBTI teachers.

Personal life 
Barr married his long-term partner Anthony Toms on 13 November 2019, becoming the first leader of an Australian state or territory government to marry someone of the same-sex.

See also

List of openly LGBT heads of government
List of LGBTI holders of political offices in Australia
2020 Australian Capital Territory general election

References

External links 

Andrew Barr Facebook page
 Andrew Barr ACT Election website

1973 births
Living people
Chief Ministers of the Australian Capital Territory
Deputy Chief Ministers of the Australian Capital Territory
Members of the Australian Capital Territory Legislative Assembly
Australian Labor Party members of the Australian Capital Territory Legislative Assembly
Labor Right politicians
Gay politicians
LGBT legislators in Australia
Australian LGBT rights activists
People from Lismore, New South Wales
Australian National University alumni
LGBT governors and heads of sub-national entities
21st-century Australian politicians
People educated at Lake Ginninderra College
21st-century Australian LGBT people